DUI or driving under the influence is the crime or offense of driving or operating a motor vehicle while impaired by alcohol or other drugs to a level that renders the driver incapable of operating a motor vehicle safely.

DUI may also refer to:
 D.U.I. (TV series), an American reality television series
 Dui (vessel), a type of bronze vessel from ancient China
 "DUI", a song by Ciara from her 2013 album Ciara
 "D.U.I.", a song by Green Day from Nimrod
 "D.U.I.", a song by The Offspring from Club Me
 Democratic Union for Integration, a political party in Macedonia
 Distinctive unit insignia, a metal heraldic device worn by soldiers in the U.S. Army
 Diving Unlimited International,  an American diving equipment designer and manufacturer
 Documento Único de Identidad, the national identity document in El Salvador
 Melvil Dui (1851–1931), also known as Melvil Dewey, an American librarian